Laas is a comune (municipality) in the province of South Tyrol in northern Italy, located about  west of the city of Bolzano.

Geography

The municipality of Laas contains the frazioni (subdivisions, mainly villages and hamlets) Allitz (Alliz), Eyrs (Oris), Tanas, and Tschengls (Cengles).

Laas (Lasa) borders the following municipalities: Mals, Martell, Prad, Schlanders, Schluderns, and Stilfs.

Geology
Laas stands on one of the largest conical debris fans in the Alps, known as Gadriamure, which emerges from the narrow valley above the village of Allitz. This fan may be of catastrophic origin, with the collapse of a mountain above the present Gadriatal. The fan blocks the main valley Vinschgau and displaces the River Etsch to its south edge, where it is cut by a gorge which revealed buried logs 7300 years old. The fan now supports irrigated fruit orchards.

Economy

Lasa marble
Laas is known for the pure white marble (known in German, Italian and English as "Laaser Marmor", "Lasa marmo" and "Lasa marble", respectively) quarried in the mountains south of the village which has been used in buildings worldwide, including the Victoria Memorial, London. The grave markers in many US military cemeteries in Europe, like the Luxembourg American Cemetery and Memorial, are also made of Lasa marble.

History

Coat-of-arms
The emblem is a gules hammer and two bits, on argent with sable stripes. The white and black symbolizes the layers of marble, the hammer and the bits the tools for its processing.

Society

Linguistic distribution
According to the 2011 census, 98.09% of the population speak German, 1.67% Italian and 0.4% Ladin as first language.

Demographic evolution

References

External links
 Homepage of the municipality

Municipalities of South Tyrol